These are a list of episodes of The Garfield Show which consists of 107 episodes in total. Each episode is 22 minutes with each segment being 11 minutes. The series debuted on France 3 in France on December 22, 2008. It aired on Cartoon Network in the United States from November 2, 2009 to October 5, 2012. It premiered on Boomerang on February 4, 2013.

Series overview

Episodes

Season 1 (2009) 

The first season premiered on December 22, 2008 in France on a TV channel known as France 3 and on November 2, 2009 in the United States on Cartoon Network, following a sneak peek on October 31, 2009.

Season 2 (2010–11)

Season 3 (2012)

Season 4 (2015–16) 
The fourth season was confirmed to be in Production in May 2012. The season first aired in Germany from October 26, 2013 to May 1, 2014. In the United States, the season began airing on October 6, 2015, with new episodes airing on Boomerang. It also has seven five-part specials, all of which are 60 minutes.

Season 5: Rodent Rebellion (2016)

According to supervising producer Mark Evanier, season 5 of The Garfield Show consists solely of the four-part special "Rodent Rebellion".

References

External links
 
 
 

Garfield Show
Garfield Show